Edward Robert Knight (13 June 1933 – 30 March 2020) was a local politician in London, England, who was leader of Lambeth London Borough Council from 1978 until he was disqualified as a councillor in 1986.

Lambeth Council
Ted Knight was active in the Labour Party from a young age but was expelled from the Party in 1956 following a purge of the Trotskyist Socialist Labour League (SLL). Knight was re-admitted to the Norwood Constituency Labour Party in 1970. In Norwood Labour Party Knight met Ken Livingstone, later Leader of the Greater London Council and Mayor of London, and the two formed an alliance to influence the selection of candidates in Norwood for the council elections in 1974. After that, they jostled for the leadership of the left within the Labour Group on Lambeth London Borough Council but Livingstone's later move to Camden in North London left the way open for Knight to become the leading left-winger within the Labour Group and Leader of the Council.

When the Conservative Government took powers through the Rates Act 1984 to limit the budgets of local councils, several left-wing Labour councils organised a rate-capping rebellion in which they refused to set a budget. All the councils eventually backed down except Liverpool City Council and Lambeth. The district auditor found that the council had lost interest on tax payments as a result, which was held to be due to the "wilful misconduct" of Knight and 31 other councillors. Each was required to repay the amount of lost interest in a surcharge and banned from holding office for five years from 1986. The Labour Party's leader, Neil Kinnock, blamed local leaders like Knight and Linda Bellos from Lambeth, for bringing the Labour Party into disrepute.

He was the Labour candidate for the marginal Hornsey constituency in the 1979 general election but lost. He stood unsuccessfully in 1981 Greater London Council election for Norwood. Prior to the 1987 general election, Knight was a potential candidate for Coventry North East: a runner-up at the Constituency Labour Party selection meeting, he lost out to John Hughes.

After Lambeth
Knight took a break from politics after being expelled from office as a result of the rate-capping rebellion. He pursued various business interests and remained treasurer of the town hall social club until it closed in 1994. He remained active within his union, Unite.

Knight was elected to the National Committee of the Labour Representation Committee at their AGM on 17 November 2007.

After the election of Jeremy Corbyn as leader of the Labour Party, Knight again became active in Lambeth Labour, securing the post of Branch Chair in Gipsy Hill ward in November 2016.

Knight died in March 2020.

References

Further reading 

1933 births
2020 deaths
People from Lambeth
Place of birth missing
Councillors in the London Borough of Lambeth
Labour Party (UK) councillors
Leaders of local authorities of England